Martin Firrell (born 4 April 1963 in Paris, France) is a British public artist.

Firrell uses language to engage directly with the public, provoking dialogue, usually about aspects of marginalisation, equality and equitable social organisation. The artist's reported aim is 'making the world more humane'.

He is one of a trio of artists (with Jenny Holzer and Barbara Kruger) known for socially engaged public art practice where text is foundational and central to that practice.

His work has been summarised as "art as debate".

Early life

Firrell was educated in England but left school unofficially at 14 because he "had no more use for it". He educated himself during his absence from school by walking and reading in the Norfolk countryside. He read early 20th-century literature extensively, citing the works of Virginia Woolf, Gertrude Stein, and the French writer Marguerite Duras (with whom he shares his birthday and a high degree of political sympathy) as key influences on his later development.

It was a passage in Anaïs Nin's novel The Four Chambered Heart that set Firrell on the path of socially engaged public works. In the passage in question, the novel's protagonist declares that literature fails to prepare us for, or guide us through, the calamities or challenges of life, and is therefore worthless.

"As I have grown older I have become more adamant that my purpose is to campaign in some way for change, using my works as a medium for catalysing debate. If you can raise debate, eventually change will follow."

Firrell sets out to remedy Nin's "worthlessness" of words by using language to raise provocative questions about society, relevant to the vast majority of people and freely available in public.

Firrell trained originally as an advertising copywriter. British social historian Joe Moran suggests Firrell is consequently well equipped to hijack public space with stealthily subversive declarations like 'Protest is liberty's ally'.

Practice

In most of Firrell's works it becomes apparent that uppermost is the belief in the redemptive power of ideas, directed at extending or protecting the right of the individual to create his or her own unique way of life and to live it accordingly without interference.

Consistent with this aim is an emphasis on participation. Complete Hero, created whilst the artist was in residence with the British Army, invited the contribution of ideas, experiences and opinions, which formed the greater proportion of the project as it evolved on the internet.

Firrell has held that the purpose of existence is to develop the richness and meaning of lived experience, that art and culture in general should be key contributors to this central project and that their success or otherwise can be measured against this criterion.

In the Sky Arts documentary The Question Mark Inside, Firrell discussed his view that contemporary art has lost its way, serving a self-elected elite, rather than the wider interests of humanity. He further claimed that art's proper place is at the centre of everyday life as a powerful force for good, that it should be a joyous expression of our shared humanity, and that his personal motto is "why settle for the art world when you can have the whole world?"

As Royal Opera House Creative Director Deborah Bull said of Firrell: "Yes he's a provocateur if you like, but the underlying message is very rarely 'life's rubbish and you're all a bunch of sharks'.... He's seeking to move beyond simple messages to something which provokes in the viewer a new sense of themselves and their place in the world".

On the same topic, Firrell has said: "I felt there was a problem with writing because of narrative – because it unfolds in time necessarily, and I was jealous of the painters where everything in painting is available in a single field. Simply, I wanted to make words work like a picture and that led me to writing aphorisms. When I wrote All Men Are Dangerous, I wrote something of immense truthfulness and importance with all of its meaning entirely available in a single field."

Firrell has used digital billboards, cinema screens, newsprint, the internet, portraiture and video interviews of culturally significant figures like Howard Jacobson, April Ashley, Johnson Beharry VC, and A C Grayling, and large-scale digital projection onto the Guards Chapel, spiritual home of the Household Division of the British Army, the National Gallery in London, the Houses of Parliament, the Royal Opera House, Covent Garden, Tate Britain, and St Paul's Cathedral.

Firrell has worked with complex and influential organisations, including the Church of England (Public Artist in Residence, St Paul's Cathedral, 2008 and again in 2016) and the British Army (Artist in Residence, Household Division, 2009). These organisations have engaged with audacious, self-questioning project content, including "I don't think this is what God intended" (West Front, St Paul's Cathedral, 2008) and "War is always a failure" (North elevation, Guards Chapel, 2009).

Firrell allowed cameras to record his creative process for the first time in 2008. The Question Mark Inside, a television documentary produced by Simon Channing Williams and Colin Burrows was first broadcast by Sky Arts 1 on 29 October 2009, and provided new insights into Firrell's opinions, aims, daily life and practice.

Ten years later, Firrell was the subject of a second documentary Overthrow the Social Order, directed by Oliver Guy-Watkins first broadcast by Sky Arts in New Zealand on 21 May 2018.

Firrell's body of work includes investigations into portraiture (Text Portrait of Howard Jacobson, Booker Prize winner, 2010) and explorations of the power of mass popular culture to propagate socially useful ideas, in particular, the science fiction genre.

In 2006, The Guardian described Firrell as "One of the capital's most influential public artists".

Writing in The Independent, Howard Jacobson stated, "I like words on public buildings and Firrell is a master at gauging their power."

Caitlin Moran for The Times described Firrell's work as being built on "huge, open-chord statements that make your ears ring".

Firrell was born in Paris, unexpectedly, on the Champs-Élysées outside what is now Sephora. He was London Cultural Ambassador for the now defunct International Herald Tribune curating the newspaper's first London Arts Season in 2005, titled "Breathless…" after Jean-Luc Godard's nouvelle vague film of the same title.

Social artwork

All Identity is Constructed appeared on UK digital billboards in 2016 examining the principle that all identities, regardless of their differences, are arbitrary constructions. Some may be less usual than others but all are similarly made-up. According to Creative Review, "The work, which gives voice to three different identities in a series of 90-second video works, presents the act of choosing one's identity as a human right. The project, says Firrell, is 'motivated by a desire to make life easier for people who don't fit into the usual identity "moulds"'."

Fires Modern was commissioned by Artichoke as part of London's Burning, a festival of arts and ideas to commemorate the 350th anniversary of the Great Fire of London. The work explored metaphorical and often lesser known "fires" from the history of progressiveness. It presented 18 moments in the history of the progressive movement including reference to black history, the history of the women's rights movement, fascism in Britain, racism, murder and contemporary references to social inclusion movements like LGBT+ and modern race equality.

Remember 1967 marked the 50th anniversary of the UK 1967 Sexual Offences Act on 27 July 2017. UK digital billboards were 'taken over' for the day, re-presenting demands made originally by 1960s activists that still warrant attention in the artist's view. Firrell worked with human rights campaigner Peter Tatchell on the Remember 1967 project. Texts include "embrace lesbianism and overthrow the social order", "homosexuals and women are systematically oppressed by male supremacist society" and "overturn the ideology of hetero male supremacy". 

Firrell also orchestrated  a 'Gender Think-In' based on the think-ins held by the Gay Liberation Front in the early 1970s, which looked to build progressive policies and protest actions. In June 2017 business, culture and policy leaders met to explore the value of gender labels and how they inform the spheres they work in. The results are published by Firrell in a policy paper that looks to map out "an alternative future for gender".

Popular culture

Metascifi (iOS app published 4 April 2015, now retired) mined popular American television science fiction for philosophical ideas with direct bearing on the project of enriching lived experience.

Contributors included Kate Mulgrew (aka Captain Kathryn Janeway, Star Trek: Voyager), Joe Flanigan (aka Colonel John Sheppard from Stargate Atlantis), Torri Higginson (aka Dr Elizabeth Weir, Stargate Atlantis), Ben Browder (aka Commander John Crichton, Farscape).

It Ends Here (2014) was commissioned by Twentieth Century Fox Film Company to coincide with the release of the eighth film in the Planet of the Apes franchise, Dawn of the Planet of the Apes.

Firrell indicated his intention was to explore the deeper meaning of Planet of the Apes’ particular corner of pop culture, locating truths that cast light on our attempts to live humanely in an over-crowded and tension-filled world"

The project extended Firrell's interest in ‘mining popular culture for quite serious content’ 

Firrell created five different underground environments in the Vaults under London's Waterloo Station, each dominated by a word or phrase: words stand tall as a man in pitch-blackness; the underground spaces rumble with found sound’. Visitors are given torches to explore and discover texts.

The artist deployed live performers in theatrical environments for the first time. The overall ambience looks to put visitors’ minds ‘in a state of alert’, said Dr Melanie Vandenbrouck, curatorial advisor on the project.

Metaworks

Metafenella is an interactive video portrait  of actress Fenella Fielding, England's First Lady of the double entendre. Video portraiture draws out life lessons from Fielding's roles as the vampiric Valeria Watt in Carry On Screaming, as Herself and Lady Hamilton in The Morecambe & Wise Show, and as The Voice in the cult TV series The Prisoner.

"I try to affect the texture of the moment because the only thing we can be sure of is this actual moment in our lives."

Early works

Two early works point to the agenda Firrell has explored extensively in mature works. Lucid Between Bouts of Sanity, published in a tri-lingual edition in 1996, is a manifesto in four sections exploring the reductive nature of action, the flaws in language, the difficulty of meaning anything accurately to anyone, and the possibility of using a constrained and reduced language to find a new expressive power. "I felt it must be possible to describe the limits within which all language must operate and so designate a clearly defined space for my own experimentation."

The manifesto was published in French, English and Russian and distributed at the ICA Cafe in London and the Literaturnoye Kafe (Saint Petersburg).

Postcards 1998 is an early, and now extremely rare, print project of 14 postcards in a green card slipcase. The project consists of 13 texts presented where postcards customarily display a picture, and a 14th card showing a photographic portrait of the artist (taken by Russian Concert Pianist, Yekaterina Lebedeva, using a disposable camera) on the Pont des Arts in Paris, mid cartwheel. It has been noted as the first of Firrell's works conceived with the sole aim of having a direct presence and influence in people's daily lives.

This project is regarded as a working prototype with influence over all subsequent works including large-scale projections of text in public space and works investigating the deep value of mass popular culture.

Residencies

Firrell has worked with large institutions that are not customarily associated with bold or controversial public statements. Firrell was Public Artist in Residence with the Household Division of the British Army in 2009, developing Complete Hero for projection onto the Guards Chapel in November 2009.

Complete Hero examined contemporary ideas of heroism based on interviews with members of the Household Division and wider Army who have experience of active service including Lance Corporal Johnson Beharry VC; with writers, thinkers and performers including actor Nathan Fillion speaking of the contemporary male hero in cult popular culture, novelist Howard Jacobson and writer Adam Nicolson speaking of the hero in literature, with the iconic writer and speaker April Ashley, comedian Shazia Mirza, and philosopher A. C. Grayling.

Members of the public contributed their own views of the meaning and significance of heroism in their lives at the Complete Hero blog.

In 2008, Firrell was Public Artist in Residence at St Paul's Cathedral. The residency culminated in The Question Mark Inside, digital text projections based on blog contributions from members of the public, interviews conducted by the artist with some of the UK's most respected thinkers, and the artist's own observations.

Commissioned by Dean and Chapter of St Paul's to mark the 300th anniversary of the topping-out of Christopher Wren's cathedral building, the project aimed to answer the questions: "what are the things that make like meaningful and purposeful, and what does St Paul's Cathedral mean in that contemporary context?"

A stream of possible answers, from the domestic to the sublime, appeared as text projections onto the south elevation of the cathedral dome, the West Front at Ludgate Hill and inside onto the Whispering Gallery. Comments about these projections can be posted on the project blog.

Whilst the means and aesthetics may be very different, Firrell's works can be regarded as the logical descendants of paintings like Delacroix's Liberty Leading the People.

Motifs and recurring themes

Several themes and campaign positions recur in Firrell's works: a plea for the value of things that are different and the point of view that what is different should be investigated for potential rather than rejected as "other" or perceived with suspicion or fear (Celebrate Difference, LED screen, Leicester Square 2001; Different Is Not Wrong, Curzon Cinemas, 2006–7; I Want To Live In A City Where People Who Think Differently Command Respect, The National Gallery, London, 2006). The artist has also consistently campaigned for gender equality and from what is customarily regarded as a feminist position (I Want To Live In A City Where Half The People In Charge Are Women, The National Gallery, London, 2006; Why Are Women Still Discriminated Against? The Question Mark Inside, St Paul's Cathedral, London 2008); Women Are Much More Honourable Than Men, quoting April Ashley, Complete Hero, Guards Chapel, London, 2009). The subjects of maleness, violence and war tend to appear in association with one another; war is often commented upon but not necessarily from a purely pacifist perspective (All Men Are Dangerous, War Is A Male Preoccupation, Keep The Faith, Tate Britain 2006; I Don’t Understand Why There Is War, The Question Mark Inside, St Paul's Cathedral, London, 2008; War Is Always A Failure, Complete Hero, Guards Chapel, London 2009).

The majority of Firrell's works include some form of ancillary visual motif. Most common are vertical lines, either scrolling from left to right, or presented as static fields in "agitated motion". Vertical lines are used to back, or underscore text, or to reveal and obscure text. Customarily the lines have been presented as white light. This vertical line motif appeared in every work between 2006 and 2010 with the exception of I Want To Live in a City Where... (The National Gallery, London, 2006).

In a 2014 interview for the bureau of sensory intelligence, Firrell responded to the question: "What qualities do you most admire in an object" with the statement, "Its power to provoke; economy of means; symmetry; the colour blue; text; an insistence (implied or inferred) on justice." This "object", so described, bears a striking resemblance to Firrell's own works of public art, and can be seen to constitute a summary manifesto for the making and showing of work in public space – blue light featured strongly in Firrell's 300th anniversary commission for St Paul's Cathedral, and simplicity, symmetry, and clearly defined political positions are hallmarks of the majority of his works.

The American art critic Daniel Gauss, writing in Arte Fuse, identified Firrell's use of text as constituting "direct engagement that rejects the need for any analysis.  Firrell is convinced that by using language he can meaningfully engage others in constructive dialogues to make the world more humane."

When questioned in the documentary 'Overthrow the Social Order' about the presence, or absence, of beauty in his artworks, Firrell answered, "I suppose everything hinges on your definition of beauty - what could be more beautiful than to try to say something about the world being more just or fairer? I can’t think of anything more exquisitely wondrous - the immense and vast beauty of justice - it’s better than all the coloured paint in the world, isn’t it? For me anyway."

Notable projects
 UK Digital Billboards Union City art inspired by Clare Short, Frances O'Grady, and Satish Kumar, 2019.
 UK Digital Billboards Power and Gender digital billboards investigating the way women regard, hold and use power, created in conversation with Clare Short, Inga Beale, Alex Mahon, Annie Rickard and Liv Garfield, 2019.
 UK Digital Billboards Remember 1967 digital billboards to mark the 50th anniversary of the 1967 Sexual Offences Act in England and Wales, 2017
 UK Digital Billboards All Identity Is Constructed text and digital video exploring the arbitrary nature of identity, 2016
 National Theatre Fires Modern digital projections of text and flame to the fly tower of the National Theatre, London, commissioned by Artichoke to commemorate the 350th anniversary of the Great Fire of London, 2016
 St Paul's Cathedral Fires Ancient digital projections of fire to the dome of St Paul's Cathedral, London, commissioned by Artichoke to commemorate the 350th anniversary of the Great Fire of London, 2016
 Metascifi iOS app / video portraiture / digital documentary, philosophical truths derived from popular American television science fiction, feat. Ben Browder, Nathan Fillion, Joe Flanigan, David Hewlett, Torri Higginson, Christopher Judge, Eddie McClintock, Kate Mulgrew, David Nykl et al., 2015
 It Ends Here installed text, haze, coloured light, found sound, performers / human nature or the road to redemption or hell, The Vaults, Waterloo Station, London 2014
 Metafenella interactive video portraiture / advice for living well from the life and work of British actress Fenella Fielding 2014
 Complete Hero largescale digital projections to the North and West elevations of the Guards Chapel, Birdcage Walk, London with Nathan Fillion, April Ashley, Howard Jacobson, Adam Nicolson, Johnson Beharry VC, A. C. Grayling, Wezley Sebastian, Gia Milinovich, Mo Blackwood, Shazia Mirza, Dr Adam Rutherford, Dr Jennifer Rohn, and others, 2009
 St Paul's Cathedral The Question Mark Inside commissioned by Dean and Chapter to celebrate the 300th anniversary of the topping-out of Christopher Wren's cathedral building. Digital text projections to the cathedral dome, West Front and Whispering Gallery, London 2008
 Curzon Cinemas 1968 (digital projections to mark the 40th anniversary of May 1968 for the festival All Power to the Imagination: 1968 and its Legacies) 2008
 Paul Hamlyn Foundation/Royal Opera House Power is always temporary (digital projection to the Royal Opera House main stage) 2007
 Royal Opera House It's Passion that Binds Us… (digital projection onto the Covent Garden elevation of the Royal Opera House) 2007
 Curzon Cinemas Different is not Wrong (35 mm projection, cinema screens) 2006-7
 Campaign against Climate Change How ironic to live in fear of terrorism and die because of climate change (xenon projection to St Pancras Station, Battersea Power Station and Parliament) 2006
 National Gallery, London I want to live in a city where… (digital projection onto the Trafalgar Square elevation of the National Gallery in London,
 The Guardian When the world's run by fools it's the duty of intelligence to disobey (projection onto Parliament) 2006
 Tate Britain All men are dangerous (words of wisdom projected onto the Duveen Gallery walls, commissioned by Amy Lamé for Duckie) 2006

References

External links

 Official page
 
 metaFenella, interactive video portrait 2014

1963 births
Living people
British activists
British artists